Sandhu Singh Gurbir (born 20 February 1951) is an Indian sports shooter. He competed in the mixed skeet event at the 1976 Summer Olympics.

References

1951 births
Living people
Indian male sport shooters
Olympic shooters of India
Shooters at the 1976 Summer Olympics
Place of birth missing (living people)
Recipients of the Arjuna Award